Tode may refer to:

People
 Arne Tode (born 1985), German motorcycle racer
 Hans-Jürgen Tode (born 1957), East German sprint canoer

Other uses
 Tōde, an Okinawan martial art
 Tode Station, a train station in Fukuyama, Hiroshima Prefecture, Japan
 Tropospheric ozone depletion events (TODE)

See also
 Toad (disambiguation)